Autogenic training is a desensitization-relaxation technique developed by the German psychiatrist Johannes Heinrich Schultz by which a psychophysiologically determined relaxation response is obtained. The technique was first published in 1932. Studying the self-reports of people immersed in a hypnotic state, J.H. Schultz noted that physiological changes are accompanied by certain feelings. Abbé Faria and Émile Coué are the forerunners of Schultz. The technique involves repetitions of a set of visualisations that induce a state of relaxation and is based on passive concentration of bodily perceptions (e.g., heaviness and warmth of arms, legs), which are facilitated by self-suggestions. The technique is used to alleviate many stress-induced psychosomatic disorders.

Biofeedback practitioners integrate basic elements of autogenic imagery and have simplified versions of parallel techniques that are used in combination with biofeedback. This was done at the Menninger Foundation by Elmer Green, Steve Fahrion, Patricia Norris, Joe Sargent, Dale Walters and others. They incorporated the hand warming imagery of autogenic training and used it as an aid to develop thermal biofeedback.

History
The roots of this technique lie in the research carried out by Oscar Vogt in the field of sleep and hypnosis. Vogt investigated individuals who had experience in hypnotic sessions. Under his guidance, they were able to go into a state (similar to a hypnotic state) for a self-determined period of time. These short-term mental exercises appeared to reduce stress or effects such as fatigue and tension. In the meantime, other disturbing effects (e.g. headaches) could be avoided. Inspired by this research and Vogt's work, Johannes Heinrich Schultz became interested in the phenomenon of autosuggestion. He wanted to explore an approach, which would avoid undesirable implications of hypnotherapy (e.g., the passivity of the individual and dependency on the therapist). When he was investigating hallucinations in healthy persons, he found that a majority of the subjects reported having two types of experienced sensation: heaviness in the extremities and feeling of warmth. Schultz wanted to understand whether simply imagining a state of heaviness and warmth in one's limbs could induce a state similar to hypnosis. Based on this idea he developed six basic exercises.

Autogenic training was popularized in North America and the English-speaking world by Wolfgang Luthe, who co-authored, with Schultz, a multi-volume tome on autogenic training. In 1963 Luthe discovered the significance of "autogenic discharges", paroxysmic phenomena of motor, sensorial, visual and emotional nature related to the traumatic history of the patient, and developed the method of "autogenic abreaction". His disciple Luis de Rivera, a McGill University-trained psychiatrist, introduced psychodynamic concepts into Luthe's approach, developing "autogenic analysis" as a new method for uncovering the unconscious.

Practice and effects
The main purpose of autogenic training is the achievement of autonomic self-regulation by removing environmental distraction, training imagery that accompanies autonomic self-regulation, and by providing a facilitative set of exercises that are easy to learn and remember.

Autogenic training is based on three main principles:
 Reduction of afferent stimulation (both exteroceptive and proprioceptive)
 Mental repetition of verbal formulae
 Passive concentration
In the context of autogenic training passive concentration means that the trainee is instructed to concentrate on inner sensations rather than environmental stimuli. Passiveness refers to allowing sensations to happen and being an observer rather than a manipulator.

The training can be performed in different postures:
 Simple sitting
 Reclined armchair
 Horizontal posture

The technique consists of six standard exercises according to Schultz:
 Muscular relaxation by repetition of a verbal formula, "My right arm is heavy", emphasizing heaviness. During the initial stages of the training, the feeling of heaviness in the trained arm is more expressed and occurs more rapidly. The same feeling can be experienced in the other extremities at the same time in the other arm. Within a week, a short concentration can trigger the sensation of heaviness in a trainee's arms and legs.
 Passive concentration focuses on feeling warm, initiated by the instruction "My right arm is warm".
 Initiation of cardiac activity using the formula "My heartbeat is calm and regular".
 Passive concentration on the respiratory mechanism with the formula "It breathes me".
 Concentration on the warmth in the abdominal region with "My solar plexus is warm" formula.
 Passive concentration on coolness in the cranial region with the formula "My forehead is cool".

When a new exercise step is added in autogenic training, the trainee should always concentrate initially on the already learned exercises and then add a new exercise. In the beginning, a new exercise is added for only brief periods.

According to the specific clinical needs, different modifications of formulas are used. These modifications can be classified into 3 main types:
 Only a few formulas are used (e.g., the formulas of heaviness and warmth)
 The standard set of formulas is taught, but one specific formula is modified
 The standard set is used and a complementary, problem-specific formula is added.

A study by Spencer suggests that autogenic training restores the balance between the activity of the sympathetic (flight or fight) and the parasympathetic (rest and digest) branches of the autonomic nervous system. The author hypothesizes that this can have important health benefits, as the parasympathetic activity promotes digestion and bowel movements, lowers the blood pressure, slows the heart rate, and promotes the functions of the immune system.

Neurophysiological aspects 
There is a lack of neurophysiological investigations addressing this topic; however, one EEG study from 1963 suggests that the decrease in afferent stimulation induces:
 A reduction in reticulo-cortical activity
 A decrease in thalamo-cortical activity
 Functional changes in the structures connected to reticular system (hypothalamus, limbic system, red nucleus, globus pallidus)
The same study suggests that EEG patterns obtained from subjects with different level of practice are not similar.

Another study from 1958 hypothesizes that autogenic state is between the normal waking state and sleep. It suggests that EEG patterns occurring during autogenic training are similar to electrophysiological changes occurring during initial stages of sleep.

Contraindications
Autogenic training is contra-indicated for children below the age of 5 and the individuals whose symptoms cannot be controlled.

Clinical application and evidence
Autogenic training has different applications and is used in a variety of pathophysiological conditions, such as bronchial asthma or hypertension, as well as psychological disorders e.g. anxiety and depression. 
Autogenic training has been subject to clinical evaluation from its early days in Germany, and from the early 1980s worldwide.  In 2002, a meta-analysis of 60 studies was published in Applied Psychophysiology and Biofeedback, finding significant positive effects of treatment when compared to normals over a number of diagnoses; finding these effects to be similar to best recommended rival therapies; and finding positive additional effects by patients, such as their perceived quality of life. Autogenic training is recommended in the 2016 European Society of Cardiology Guideline for prevention of cardiovascular disease in persons who experience psychosocial problems. The International Journal of Dermatology conducted a study and found that Autogenic Training was potentially helpful for improving aged skin in women experiencing menopause. 

In Japan, researchers from the Tokyo Psychology and Counseling Service Center have formulated a measure for reporting clinical effectiveness of autogenic training.

Versus other relaxation techniques 
The principle of passive concentration in autogenic training makes this technique different from other relaxation techniques such as progressive muscle relaxation and biofeedback, in which trainees try to control physiological functions. As in biofeedback, bidirectional change in physiological activity is possible. Autogenic training is classified as a self-hypnotic technique. It is different from hetero-hypnosis, where trance is induced by another individual. Autogenic training emphasizes a trainee's independence and gives control from therapist to the trainee. By this, the need for physiological feedback devices or a hypnotherapist is eliminated.

See also
 Affirmations
 Progressive muscle relaxation
 Qigong
 Suggestion
 The Relaxation Response
 Yoga nidra

References

Further reading
 
 
  Republished in 2001 by The British Autogenic Society. In six volumes.
Vol. 1 Autogenic Methods
Vol. 2 Medical Applications
Vol. 3 Applications in Psychotherapy
Vol. 4 Research and Theory
Vol. 5 Dynamics of Autogenic Neutralisation
Vol. 6 Treatment with Autogenic Neutralisation

External links
 The British Autogenic Society

Meditation
Hypnosis
Treatment of mental disorders
Mind–body interventions